The Ohio Court of Claims is a court of limited, statewide jurisdiction. The court's jurisdiction extends to cases:
Against the State of Ohio, in which the state has waived sovereign immunity
Connected to suits against the State of Ohio where Plaintiffs are asking for equitable relief
Involving denial of access to public records by the State or any county, city, or agency.

The court also hears appeals from decisions made by the Ohio Attorney General on claims allowed under the Victims of Crime Act.

The judges of the Court of Claims sit by assignment by the Chief Justice of the Supreme Court of Ohio. Currently, the assigned judges and magistrates are:
 Judge Dale A. Crawford
 Magistrate Holly T. Shaver
 Magistrate Robert Van Schoyck
 Magistrate Gary W. Peterson
 Magistrate Scott Sheets

A Special Master hears claims for violations of access to public records.  Jeffery W. Clark serves as the court's Special Master.

Appeals from the Court of Claims are heard by the Tenth District Court of Appeals in Columbus.

The court is located in the Thomas J. Moyer Ohio Judicial Center in Columbus.

The clerk of the court is Anderson Renick.

History 
The Ohio Court of Claims was created in 1975 by the passage of the Court of Claims Act. The Court was created to replace the Sundry Claims Board which existed from 1917 through 1975. The Board was considered inadequate for hearing claims against the state for a number of reasons, including that the Attorney General both sat on the Board and had the job of representing the State of Ohio before the Board.

References

External links
 

Ohio state courts
1975 establishments in Ohio
Courts and tribunals established in 1975